Pestalotiopsis adusta is a fungal plant pathogen infecting tea and avocados.

References

Fungal plant pathogens and diseases
Tea diseases
Avocado tree diseases
adusta